Goofy Ridge is an unincorporated community and census-designated place in Quiver Township, Mason County, Illinois, United States. As of the 2020 census, its population was 210, down from 350 in 2010. Goofy Ridge is given Topeka mailing addresses.

According to American Journal by Gary Gladstone, Goofy Ridge got its name thus:
{{quote|Years back it was just The Ridge, a camp near the river bank where moonshiners and other carousers met weekly to do their drinking. After some serious drinking one night, a local game warden said he wasn't too drunk to shoot a walnut off the head of a volunteer. Naturally, someone was drunk enough to volunteer. The game warden placed the tiny target on the volunteer's head, aimed his .22 rifle, and shot the nut right off. This caper was called by a witness "one damned goofy thing to do," and the camp was ever after known as Goofy Ridge.

The abstract of the academic paper "Goofy Ridge: On Human Ecology, Poverty, and the Labeling of Places" hints there may be a social significance associated with this incident, something confirmed by a segment on Weekend America. According to Storyville, USA by Dale Peterson, "Al Capone, as a matter of fact, used to come down [to Goofy Ridge] to hunt and fish."

Demographics

See also
List of census-designated places in Illinois

References

Census-designated places in Illinois
Census-designated places in Mason County, Illinois